Cecil John "Jack" Hazlitt (1897–1993) was an Australian soldier who fought in World War I.

Early life
Hazlitt was born between 15 June and 31 December 1897 in Melbourne, Victoria, Australia.

Career
Hazlitt enlisted to join Australian forces on 27 February 1915, and embarked from Fremantle on 9 June 1915. He arrived at Gallipoli in July of that year, and fought in the Gallipoli Campaign as a runner. The average runner at Gallipoli survived for 24 hours, but Hazlitt survived for five months. He later fought in the Battles of Pozières and the Somme, before leaving to return to Australia on 26 December 1916.

Death
Hazlitt died on 15 June 1993 in New South Wales, Australia, aged 95, while living in MacMasters Beach.

References

1897 births
1993 deaths
People educated at Haileybury (Melbourne)
Australian Army soldiers
Australian military personnel of World War I